The Threeep is a three-part EP (hence the title) consisting of three singles from the album The Dark Leaves, by Matt Pond PA. Each single consists of three songs; a single from the album and two b-sides, one instrumental and one not. Several of Matt Pond's core bandmembers contributed to these sessions, including Chris Hansen (engineering, co-producing, guitar), Eve Miller (cello), Christian Frederickson (viola) and Dan Crowell (drums). Initially announced in 2009, each single was meant to be released on limited edition vinyl by Altitude Records, the design allowing for the three sleeves to clip together to form a cube, but to date only the first installment was ever pressed with an unspecified number on black vinyl, and 250 on colored vinyl. The first installment was also released on iTunes, but is no longer available, the second installment was digitally released on iTunes and Amazon MP3, and on September 18, 2013, the entire EP was eventually released as a free digital download via NoiseTrade and announced on Filter Magazine's website.

Release history
First Installment - November 6, 2009 
The Threeep - Part I - Starting

Second Installment - May 11, 2010 
The Threeep - Part II - Remains

Third Installment - September 18, 2013 
The Threeep - Part III - Ruins

Track listing
 "Starting" – 3:23
 "The Colour Out Of Space" – 3:07
 "Stopping" – 3:14
 "Remains" – 5:35
 "Some Debris" – 2:14
 "Calls from Canada" – 3:11
 "Ruins" – 3:47
 "The Wrong Man" – 2:09
 "Remember Me" – 2:55

References

External links
Matt Pond PA Official website

2010 EPs
Matt Pond PA EPs